The 51st International Film Festival Rotterdam, is the 2022 edition of the International Film Festival Rotterdam, which took place online from 26 January 2022 to 6 February 2022. The festival, which was held online for the second consecutive year due to the spread of the Omicron variant across Europe, opened with Amanda Kramer's film Please Baby Please. The festival closed with the screening of 1967 sword fighting classic Dragon Inn by King Hu on 6 February 2022.

Jury

Tiger
 Gust Van den Berghe: Brussels-based writer and director with background in theatre, opera and dance.
 Tatiana Leite: (Brazil), Graduate in Law and Communication from PUC-RJ University, postgraduate in Film at UNESA and in History of Art at Sorbonne. A film programmer at the Rio Film Festival from 2000 till 2009, in 2010 she became the International Adviser of the Rio de Janeiro State Secretariat of Culture. In the end of 2012 she created the production company Bubbles Project.
 Thekla Reuten: (Netherlands), a European actress
 Zsuzsi Bankuti: Film festivals organizer and director of the cinema programme

Ammodo Tiger Short
 Nduka Mntambo: An image-maker, working in the interstices of urban spatial practices, experimental filmmaking, and pedagogy. 
 Rieke Vos: A curator and writer based in Amsterdam who works in a cross-disciplinary field of art, popular culture, architecture, and urban life.
 Tim Leyendekker: (Netherlands) Dutch visual artist, filmmaker and photographer

Big Screen Award
 Louk Haffmans
 Alex Spaanderman
 Eva Langerak
 Karen Kroese
 Mylaine Roelofs

Official selection

Opening and closing films

Tiger
The following films are selected to compete for the Tiger Award. The line-up was announced on 7 January 2022.
Highlighted title indicates award winner.

Big Screen
The following films are selected to compete for the VPRO Big Screen Award.
Highlighted title indicates award winner

Ammodo Tiger Short
The following films were selected to compete for the Ammodo Tiger Short Competition.
Highlighted title indicates award winner

Bright Future
The programme will highlight first-feature films from promising filmmakers.

Cinema Regained
The programme offers restored classic films, documentaries on film culture and explorations of cinema's heritage.

Harbour
The programme will showcase contemporary cinema.

Limelight
The programme will showcase cinematic highlights of film festival favourites and international award-winners.

Short & Mid-length
The programmes highlight mid-length films and short films.

Awards

References

External links
 

International Film Festival Rotterdam
Events in Rotterdam
2022 festivals in Europe
International Film Festival Rotterdam